was a Japanese magazine editor and photographer of nature.

Tamura was born in Chiba in 1910, but his family moved to Tokyo in 1924. Under the influence of his father, an amateur photographer, he started taking photographs in 1927.

Tamura worked from 1936 till 1973 in a succession of editorial posts, mostly preparing educational materials about nature. The first of these was within Kōgasha, where he worked on the photography magazine Gekkan Kogata Kamera. He subsequently moved to Seibundō Shinkōsha, where he was the chief editor of the magazine of science for children Kodomo no Kagaku and the astronomy magazine Tenmon Gaido.

Tamura's book of photography of insects, showing the activities and life-cycles of insects, made him an innovator in Japan, where insect photography had previously been limited to unimaginative depictions of dead specimens.

Tamura won an award  from the Ministry of Education  in 1951 for the book Konchū no seitai.

Between 1954 and 1960, Tamura took many photographs of bird life, and the increasing threats to this, along the stretch of the Tama River between Tokyo and Kawasaki, increasingly polluted and with an increasing percentage of its banks used for group leisure pursuits. In a book-length anthology of these published in 1962, he pointed out the decrease in the variety of bird life, and warned of the danger of further increases to come. Photographs from the book were exhibited in the National Science Museum of Japan in 1963.

Tamura died in 2003.

Books

Tōdai no hanashi. Tokyo: Tōa Shorin, 1943.  A book for children.
 Konchū no seitai: Raika shashinshū / Closeups  on Insects. Tokyo: Seibundo-Shinkosha, 1951. Most of the text in Japanese only, but with terse captions in English as well.
 Konchū (Insects). Iwanami Shashin Bunko. Tokyo: Iwanami, 1953. A joint work.
Tamagawa no tori / Birds of River Tama. Tokyo: Seibundo-Shinkosha, 1961. With captions and some text in English as well as Japanese.
 Tamura Sakae shashinshū: Shizen no katasumi de (Sakae Tamura photograph collection: In the nooks of nature). Tokyo: Seibundo-Shinkosha, 1965. Photographs of plants, insects, reptiles and birds, as noticed often hidden away. Mostly black and white, some color.
 Kamakura kaidō (The Kamakura road). Tokyo: Seibundo-Shinkosha, 1990. . Color and black and white photographs of sights of nature along the Kamakura Kaidō, an ancient road.

Notes

Sources

Neichā wārudo: Chikyū ni ikiru / Nature World: Life on Earth. Tokyo: Tokyo Metropolitan Museum of Photography, 1997. Exhibition catalogue, with texts and captions in Japanese and English.
Nihon no shashinka / Biographic Dictionary of Japanese Photography. Tokyo: Nichigai Associates, 2005. .   Despite the English-language alternative title, all in Japanese.
Sekiji, Kazuko. “Nature World: Life on Earth.” 185–91. In Nature World: Life on Earth.
Unno, Kazuo. "Tamura Sakae: Konchū no seitai". Unno Kazuo no dejitaru konchūki / Kazuo Unno's Insects World of Digital.  14 December 2007.  Accessed 8 June 2008.

Japanese ornithologists
Japanese entomologists
Japanese environmentalists
Japanese photographers
Artists from Chiba Prefecture
Nature photographers
1910 births
2003 deaths
Japanese magazine editors
20th-century Japanese zoologists